The Buster Keaton Show was a television series broadcast in 1950 starring Buster Keaton. It was broadcast over KTTV, which at the time was the Los Angeles affiliate of CBS (the network would start KNXT in 1951).

In 1949, comedian Ed Wynn invited Keaton to appear on his CBS Television comedy-variety show, The Ed Wynn Show, which was televised live on the West Coast. Kinescopes were made for distribution of the programs to other parts of the country, since there was no transcontinental coaxial cable until September 1951. Reaction was strong enough for a local Los Angeles station to offer Keaton his own show, also broadcast live, in 1950.

The Buster Keaton Comedy Show was Keaton's second foray into the new medium of television. It followed the 1949 one-off. Broadcast live, no record of that first program remains and it was not seen by viewers outside California, as it was not filmed in kinescope nor was there a coaxial cable linking the coasts at that time.

Life with Buster Keaton (Date unknown, probably 1950 or 1951) was an attempt to recreate the first series on film, allowing the program to be broadcast nationwide. The series benefited from a company of veteran actors, including Marcia Mae Jones as the ingenue, Iris Adrian, Dick Wessel, Fuzzy Knight, Dub Taylor, Philip Van Zandt, and his silent-era contemporaries Harold Goodwin, Hank Mann, and stuntman Harvey Parry. Buster Keaton's wife Eleanor also was seen in the series (notably as Juliet to Buster's Romeo in a little-theater vignette). Keaton said that he canceled the filmed series himself, because he was unable to create enough fresh material to produce a new show each week. Several episodes from the show were assembled into a feature-length film that was released theatrically in the United Kingdom as The Misadventures of Buster Keaton.

Lack of information
Unfortunately, there is a lack of information on this show or shows. It is unknown how many TV shows Buster Keaton starred in, how many episodes were released, what those episodes were called, what episode number they were, what year episodes were released in, etc. The most information we have is that there is a handful of available episodes from probably more than one show and a movie made which compiles footage from at least three episodes. These episodes have had several different titles attributed to them. It is entirely possible that information on The Buster Keaton Show, The Buster Keaton Comedy Show, and Life with Buster Keaton is falsely attributed to one show when it correctly is about another. The Buster Keaton Comedy Show especially lacks knowledge. Some sources have listed Life with Buster Keaton as having started airing in 1951, however, The Misadventures of Buster Keaton is known to have been released in 1950. It is possible that the footage was derived from then unaired episodes, but this is unconfirmed.

An episode of The Buster Keaton Show, and three episodes of Life with Buster Keaton can be viewed on the Internet Archive. The former is a kinescope of a live telecast, and includes the original commercials for Studebaker cars. (This was an era where television shows typically had a single sponsor, with The Buster Keaton Show having three commercial breaks, each for Studebaker.)

References

External links

Buster Keaton
1950s American sketch comedy television series
1950 American television series debuts